The Morne Diablo Limestone is a geologic formation in Morne Diablo (pronounced, in the local English dialect, "Mun Jablo"), Trinidad and Tobago. It preserves fossils dating back to the Oligocene period. The formation is laterally equivalent to the Cipero Marl and San Fernando Formation.

See also 

 List of fossiliferous stratigraphic units in Trinidad and Tobago

References 

Geologic formations of Trinidad and Tobago
Paleogene Trinidad and Tobago
Limestone formations